Surendranagar Dudhrej is a municipality in Surendranagar district in the Indian state of Gujarat. Dudhrej municipality is directly connected with Wadhwan city and Wadhwan municipality.

Etymology 
Dudhrej was originally a nes (hamlet) settled by the Charanas. One Shastam Swami wanted a temple to be built on the bank of the tank, so he started a shrine. The Charan ladies of the village would pour milk (dudh) over a particular place at the shrine due to which the place began to be known as Dudhrej.

Demographics
 India census, Dudhrej had a population of 156,417. Males constitute 52% of the population and females 48%. Dudhrej has an average literacy rate of 71%, higher than the national average of 59.5%: male literacy is 77%,  and female literacy is 64%. In Dudhrej, 12% of the population is under 6 years of age.

Religious importance

Vadwala Mandir of Rabari community and Mandavrayji Dada Mandir of Rajput Community is Situated in Muli here This community's people do visit this place often and on the important ritual days.

SHRI VADWALA MANDIR DUDHAREJDHAM is located in Wadhwan taluka of Surendranagar district, five kilometers north of Surendranagar village, on the road to Dhrangadhra in the north. In Dudhrej village, in the tradition of Acharya, with the inspiration of the 31st disciple Shri Nilkanthaswamy and with the auspicious blessings Shri Vaishnu's  Shri Vatapati (Vadvala Dev) Bhagwan is located. His deity is Ayodhyapati Lord Shri Ramchandraji and he is known as Shri Vatapati or Vadwala all over Gujarat as well as outside Gujarat.

The Surendranagar Trimandir is located 17.1 km away from the city of Surendranagar (Gujarat), near Lok Vidhyalaya, on Muli Road.

References

Cities and towns in Surendranagar district
Charan